John McEnroe was the defending champion, but lost in the final this year.

Björn Borg  won the title, defeating John McEnroe 6–3, 6–4 in the final.

Seeds

  Björn Borg (champion)
  John McEnroe (final)
  Gene Mayer (semifinals)
  Harold Solomon (first round)
  Brian Gottfried (second round)
  Eliot Teltscher (second round)
  Wojtek Fibak (second round)
  Victor Amaya (second round)

Draw

Final

Top half

Bottom half

External links
 ATP main draw

Stockholm Open
1980 Grand Prix (tennis)